Antoine-Nicolas Louis Bailly (6 June  1810 – 1 January 1892) was a French architect.

Life 

Born in Paris as the son of a postal official and the eldest of eleven children, Bailly entered the atelier of architect François Debret and through him the École nationale supérieure des Beaux-Arts in 1830, also studying under Félix Duban.

From 1834, upon his father's retirement, Bailly found himself responsible as the breadwinner for the entire family. In 1850, with the support of Eugène Viollet-le-Duc, Bailly became the architect of the dioceses of Bourges, Valencia and Digne.  From 1875 to 1886, he served as diocesan architect of Limoges, and he was also the supervising architect of the Notre Dame de Paris from 1883 to 1886, after Viollet-le-Duc's restorations.

In 1854 Bailly was appointed inspector of works in Paris.  As such he participated in the completion of the Old Town Hall and the construction of the Fontaine Molière under Louis Visconti.  In 1860, Baron Georges-Eugène Haussmann commissioned Bailly with the administrative building for the 4th arrondissement of Paris, which served as a model for others.

His best-known work overall, although not the most admired, is the Tribunal de commerce de Paris (Commercial Court of Paris) on the Île de la Cité, completed in 1865, which Napoleon III had requested be designed in the style of the town hall of Brescia.  Its business courts are organized around a glass atrium reaching the entire height of the building.  The exterior features architectural sculpture by Albert-Ernest Carrier-Belleuse.

Bailly was made a Knight of the Legion of Honour in 1853, Officer in 1868, and promoted to Commander in 1881.  He was elected to the Académie des Beaux-Arts in 1875, taking the chair of Henri Labrouste, and served as its president; he was also the first president of the Société des Artistes Français upon its founding in 1881.

Architect Ernest Sanson began his career as a draftsman in Bailly's firm, and took over the office in 1865.

Work 

 expansion of the Cathedral of Saint-Jerome Cathedral of Digne, completed 1862
 construction of the bell tower of the Valencia Cathedral
 completion of the cathedral of Limoges
 Tribunal de commerce de Paris (Commercial Court of Paris) 1860-1865
 facade of the Lycée Saint-Louis, Paris
 mairie of the 4th arrondissement of Paris, 1866–1868
 Crédit Foncier de France, Paris (restoration and redevelopment)

References

External links 
 structurae page
 online biography in French

1810 births
1892 deaths
École des Beaux-Arts alumni
Burials at Père Lachaise Cemetery
Commandeurs of the Légion d'honneur
19th-century French architects
Members of the Académie des beaux-arts